or  is an early Irish male name, which also has the hypocoristic and diminutive forms , ,  and .

In Scottish Gaelic  the name is Eòghann or Eòghan. All of the above are often anglicised as Ewen or, less often, Owen. The name in both Goidelic languages is generally considered a derivative of the Greek and Latin name , meaning "noble born".

Etymology
Morgan notes that there are less likely alternative explanations and agrees with Dr Rachel Bromwich that Welsh  “is normally latinized as Eugenius," and "both the Welsh and Irish forms are Latin derivatives".

Eoghan has also been translated into English as "well born", in an example c. 1923, due to this Latin derivation; but with the note that in common usage it is usually anglicised to "Eugene". The name corresponds to the Welsh , often spelt  in English; as well to Ewen, Ewan and Euan. The most likely and widely accepted origin of the Old Welsh  is,  like the Old Irish  also from Latin .

List of people

Celtic nobility
 , king of Fernmag in the Ulster Cycle of Irish mythology
 , king of 
 , eponymous ancestor of the 
  of Ardstraw (6th century), Irish saint
  (died 839), king of Fortriu
  of Argyll (died in or after 1268)
 , harper and a servant of the 9th Earl of Kildare
 , sometimes known as 
  (fl. 934), King of the Cumbrians
  (died 1015), King of the Cumbrians
 , King of the Cumbrians

Recent times
 Eoghan Corry, Irish journalist and historian
 Eoghan Fitzsimons, former Attorney General of Ireland
 Eoghan Harris, Irish politician
 Eoghan Hickey, rugby player
 Eoghan McDermott (MacDiarmada), tv broadcaster
 Eoghan Quigg, Singer

See also
 Eòghann and Eòghan at List of Scottish Gaelic given names
 Egan, Eoin, Euan, Evan, Ewan, Ewen, Ewin, Ewing
 
 List of rulers of 
 
 McEwan
 MacEwen, Clan MacEwen
 McCown
 Clan MacCowan
 Clan Ewing
 Clan Ewen of Otter
 Eóganachta
 Irish name

Notes

Irish-language masculine given names